Mathias Fixelles (born 11 August 1996) is a Belgian professional footballer who plays for Belgian First Division A club Westerlo. He can play either as a central or attacking midfielder.

Club career
Mathias Fixelles started his career with Woluwe-Zaventem.

On 11 June 2021, he signed a three-year contract with Kortrijk.

On 31 January 2022, Fixelles moved to Westerlo on a 2.5-year contract.

Honours 
Westerlo

 Belgian First Division B: 2021–22

References

External links
 
 

1996 births
People from Soignies
Living people
Belgian footballers
Association football midfielders
Oud-Heverlee Leuven players
A.F.C. Tubize players
Sint-Truidense V.V. players
K.V. Woluwe-Zaventem players
Royale Union Saint-Gilloise players
K.V. Kortrijk players
K.V.C. Westerlo players
Challenger Pro League players
Belgian Pro League players
Footballers from Hainaut (province)